Miron Schmückle (born 1966 in Sibiu/Hermannstadt) is a German-Romanian artist, stage designer and cultural researcher. He lives and works as a freelance artist in Berlin (Germany) since 2008.

In his drawings, Schmückle develops a hybrid, botanical world of forms that moves between hyperrealism and escapism of reality through his interest in art history as well as his preoccupation with non-European flora and fauna. This still finds application above all in his scientific-botanical plant still lifes, whose complex structures Schmückle does not copy from natural models, but composes independently.

Life and artistic development 
Schmückle grew up in Romania during the Ceaușescu dictatorship. According to Schmückle's autobiographical texts, his interest in art history was aroused by a joint visit to the Brukenthal Museum with his father in the 1970s. Here he was impressed by the paintings of the polymath Joris Hoefnagel with his allegorical cabinet miniatures from 1597.

In 1988 he left Romania and emigrated to the Federal Republic of Germany. Between 1991 and 1996 he studied Experimental Painting at the Muthesius Academy of Art in Kiel (Germany), among others with Renate Anger. In 1994 he joined the performance artist Marina Abramović at the University of Fine Arts of Hamburg. Since, in Schmückle's view, conceptual art was very dominant at universities in the mid-1990s and drawing was not taught at university, he taught himself to do this independently. His self-study drawings eventually serve as his final project at Muthesius.

Between 1995 and 1996, Schmückle held a teaching position at the Saint Petersburg Theatre Academy in the field of installation art.

When the art market collapsed due to the financial crisis in 2008 and commissions thus failed to materialise, Schmückle wrote his doctoral thesis, which was published at the Muthesius Academy of Fine Arts in 2016 under the title Una terza natura. In terms of content, his doctoral thesis deals with the cabinet miniatures of Joris Hoefnagel.

Exhibitions (selection)

Solo exhibitions 

 1997 – Museum Ostdeutsche Galerie, Regensburg (Germany): Hortus conclusus
 1997 – Kunsthalle Kiel, Kiel (Germany): over a long season
 2001 – Galerie Anita Beckers, Frankfurt am Main (Germany): Super Cascade Improved Mixed
 2002 – Hamburger Kunsthalle, Hamburg (Germany): Fountains of Joy. Improved Formula
 2004 – Gallery Anita Beckers, Frankfurt am Main (Germany): Capriccio
 2005 – Gallery Dörrie*Priess, Hamburg (Germany): New Works
 2007 – Gallery Emmanuel Post, Leipzig (Germany): de naturae corporis fabrica
 2007 – Gallery Rena Bransten, San Francisco (USA): Rococo Revisited
 2009 – Brukenthal Museum, Sibiu (Romania): The Strife of Love in a Dream
 2010 – Gallery Dörrie*Priess, Hamburg (Germany): illectus eram
 2011 – Gallery Manzoni Schäper, Berlin (Germany): As You Desire Me
 2016 – Kunstmuseum Bayreuth, Bayreuth (Germany): Una terza natura
 2017 – Anca Poteraşu Gallery, Bucharest (Romania): Non saturatur oculus visu
 2023 – Städel Museum, Frankfurt am Main (Germany)

Group exhibitions 

 1998 – 4th International Photo Triennial, Esslingen (Germany)
 1999 – 2nd Ars Baltica Triennial of Photographic Art
 1999 – Kunsthalle Kiel, Kiel (Germany): Photography on Site
 2000 – Gallery Dörrie*Priess, Hamburg (Germany): In the Garden
 2000 – Kunsthaus Hamburg, Hamburg (Germany): Reflected Images
 2001 – Ursula-Blickle-Foundation, Kraichtal (Germany)
 2001 – Palais for Contemporary Art, Glückstadt (Germany): Desire
 2002 – Museo Galleria d'Arte Moderna, Bologna (Italy): Desire
 2002 – 2nd Triennial of Photography, Hamburg (Germany): Still Life
 2002 – Kallmann Museum, Ismaning (Germany): Self Portraits
 2003 – Kunsthaus Erfurt, Erfurt (Germany): Kunsthappen
 2003 – Kunsthaus Erfurt, Erfurt (Germany): You and your garden
 2004 – Museum Haus Esters, Krefeld (Germany): Zwischenwelten
 2004 – Schwules Museum, Berlin (Germany): 19 artists as guests at the Schwules Museum
 2004 – Wifredo Lam Foundation, Havana (Cuba): Bailar en la casa del trompo
 2005 – Kunstraum München, Munich (Germany): Jungle Park
 2005 – Museum Morsbroich, Leverkusen (Germany): Flower Pieces
 2006 – Chiesa di San Paolo, Modena (Italy): Fai da te - il mondo dell artista
 2007 – Post Fine Arts, Freiburg (Germany): Bilderbühne
 2008 – Post Fine Arts, Freiburg (Germany): Menschenskind
 2008 – Municipal Gallery Villa Zanders, Bergisch Gladbach (Germany): Pas de deux
 2009 – Post Fine Arts, Freiburg (Germany): Comming Under the Spotlight
 2009 – Kunsthalle Göppingen, Göppingen (Germany): Flower Pieces
 2010 – Alexander Ochs Galleries, Beijing (China): Beauty - Flowers in Photography
 2013 – Collège des Bernardins, Paris (France): Tree of Life
 2017 – Kallmann Museum, Ismaning (Germany): Beautifully Ephemeral - Flowers in Contemporary Art
 2019 – Sprengel Museum, Hanover (Germany): Four Times New on Paper
 2021 – Staatliche Kunsthalle Karlsruhe, Karlsruhe (Germany): Inventing Nature. Plants in Art
 2021 – Kunsthalle München, Munich (Germany): Flowers Forever. Flowers in Art and Culture

Works in public and private art collections (selection) 
Schmückle's works are represented in renowned collections worldwide, including:

 Kunsthalle Kiel, Kiel (Germany)
 Ludwig Forum for International Art, Aachen (Germany)
 Kunstforum Ostdeutsche Galerie, Regensburg (Germany)
 Internationales Künstlerhaus Villa Concordia, Bamberg (Germany)
 Isobe Art Collection, Tokyo (Japan)
 West Collection, Pennsylvania (USA)
 Schwules Museum, Berlin (Germany)
 City Gallery, Kiel (Germany)
 Berlinische Galerie - State Museum of Modern Art, Berlin (Germany)

References

External links 

 Website of the artist

1966 births
Living people
German artists
German contemporary artists
People from Sibiu
Romanian emigrants to Germany